Werner Paul Kaspi (born 12 July 1917) was an Israeli footballer who played as a forward for Beitar Tel Aviv and Maccabi Netanya at club level, and the Mandatory Palestine national team internationally.

Kaspi captained Mandatory Palestine in their last international match against Lebanon in 1940, scoring two goals; it was his only international cap.

References

External links
 

1917 births
Year of death missing
Jewish Israeli sportspeople
Association football forwards
Mandatory Palestine footballers
Israeli footballers
Mandatory Palestine international footballers
Beitar Tel Aviv F.C. players
Maccabi Netanya F.C. players